William McIntyre (10 April 1877 – 18 April 1943) was an Australian cricketer. He played four first-class matches for New South Wales between 1905/06 and 1906/07.

See also
 List of New South Wales representative cricketers

References

External links
 

1877 births
1943 deaths
Australian cricketers
New South Wales cricketers
People from the Central West (New South Wales)
Cricketers from New South Wales